The Northeast-10 Conference men's basketball tournament is the annual conference women's basketball championship tournament for the Northeast-10 Conference. The tournament has been held annually since 1982. It is a single-elimination tournament and seeding is based on regular season records.

The winner receives the conference's automatic bid to the NCAA Women's Division II Basketball Championship.

Results

Championship records

 New Haven and Saint Michael's have not yet qualified for the tournament finals
 Hartford and Quinnipiac never qualified for the tournament finals as conference members
 Schools highlighted in pink are former members of the Northeast-10 Conference

See also
Northeast-10 Conference men's basketball tournament

References

NCAA Division II women's basketball conference tournaments
Tournament
Recurring sporting events established in 1981